Wood Building, also known as the Central Inn, Central Hotel, Central Tavern, Central Bar, Corner Inn, Corner Bar, Corner Pub, and Mac's Tavern, is a historic commercial building located at Cape Girardeau, Missouri.  It built around the 1900’s, and is a rectangular, three-story, red brick, two-part commercial block building.  It features an original, decorative sheet-metal cornice, a prominent parapet, and a cast-iron column at the recessed corner entrance.

It was listed on the National Register of Historic Places in 2003.

References

Commercial buildings on the National Register of Historic Places in Missouri
Commercial buildings completed in 1910
Buildings and structures in Cape Girardeau County, Missouri
National Register of Historic Places in Cape Girardeau County, Missouri